The 1975 Toledo Rockets football team was an American football team that represented the University of Toledo in the Mid-American Conference (MAC) during the 1975 NCAA Division I football season. In their fifth season under head coach Jack Murphy, the Rockets compiled a 5–6 record (4–4 against MAC opponents), finished in sixth place in the MAC, and were outscored by all opponents by a combined total of 277 to 244.

The team's statistical leaders included Gene Swick with 2,487 passing yards, Tim Zimmerman with 496 rushing yards, and Scott Resseguie with 683 receiving yards.

Schedule

Roster

References

Toledo
Toledo Rockets football seasons
Toledo Rockets football